Amanabad may refer to:
 Amanabad, Markazi
 Amanabad, North Khorasan
 Amanabad, Razavi Khorasan
 Amanabad, Sistan and Baluchestan
 Amanabad Rural District, in Markazi Province